Vila Tolstói is a monorail station of São Paulo Metro. Belongs to Line 15-Silver, which is actually in expansion, and should go to Cidade Tiradentes, with connection with Line 2-Green in Vila Prudente. It is placed in Av. Prof. Luis Inácio de Anhaia Mello, 7753, next to Rua Angical do Piauí, in the border of the districts of São Lucas and Sapopemba.

It was opened by the Government of the State of São Paulo on April 6, 2018.

Station layout

References

São Paulo Metro stations
Railway stations opened in 2018